Hervé IV of Donzy (1173– 22 January 1222) was a French nobleman and participant in the Fifth Crusade. By marriage in 1200 to Mahaut de Courtenay (1188–1257), daughter of Peter II of Courtenay, he became Count of Nevers.

In a dispute over the château de Gien with Peter of Courtenay, Hervé came to a settlement in 1199, having defeated and captured his overlord Peter at Cosne-sur-Loire. After Peter's death in 1219, he became Count of Auxerre and Tonnerre also; with Philip II, Marquis of Namur and Robert de Courtenay contesting Auxerre. He acquired Liernais also, in 1210.

Hervé and his countess were active in developing the Nivernais, his lands around Donzy adjoining the Nivernais and Burgundy. He reconstructed the château Musard, Billy-sur-Oisy, around 1212–5. The priory at Beaulieu was founded in 1214.

In 1204–05 Hervé supported the French side against the English in fighting in Normandy, Poitou and Touraine, and in 1209 would take part in the Albigensian Crusade. In 1214 he took part in the Battle of Bouvines, on the side of King John of England, later with John's intervention Hervé would obtain King Philip's pardon. In 1217 he would be involved in the French invasion of England.

He died at Saint-Aignan. His death has been attributed to poison.

Family
The daughter of Hervé and Mahaut, 
Agnès de Donzy (1205–1225), married in 1217 Philippe de France, eldest son of the future Louis VIII of France. Philippe died the following year. Agnès then married Count Guy II of Saint-Pol (died 1226), with three children, including Yolande I.

Following Hervé's death in 1222, Mahaut married Guigues IV of Forez in 1226.

Notes

References

1222 deaths
Christians of the Third Crusade
People of the Albigensian Crusade
Christians of the Fifth Crusade
1173 births
12th-century French people
13th-century French people